Diplothyron is a genus of South American dwarf spiders. It was first described by Alfred Frank Millidge in 1991.

Species 
, it contains twelve species:

 Diplothyron ballesterosi Silva-Moreira & Hormiga, 2022 — Mexico
 Diplothyron chiapasius (Gertsch & Davis, 1946) — Mexico, Honduras
 Diplothyron dianae Silva-Moreira & Hormiga, 2022 — Costa Rica, Panama
 Diplothyron fuscus Millidge, 1991 (type) — Mexico, Costa Rica, Panama, Colombia, Venezuela
 Diplothyron linguatulus (F. O. Pickard-Cambridge, 1902) — Mexico, Guatemala
 Diplothyron monteverde Silva-Moreira & Hormiga, 2022 — Costa Rica
 Diplothyron nigritus (F. O. Pickard-Cambridge, 1902) — Mexico, Guatemala, Nicaragua, Costa Rica, Panama
 Diplothyron nubilosus Silva-Moreira & Hormiga, 2022 — Costa Rica, Panama
 Diplothyron sandrae Silva-Moreira & Hormiga, 2022 — Costa Rica
 Diplothyron simplicata (F. O. Pickard-Cambridge, 1902) — Guatemala, Costa Rica, Panama
 Diplothyron solitarius Silva-Moreira & Hormiga, 2022 — Guatemala
 Diplothyron trifalcatus (F. O. Pickard-Cambridge, 1902) — Mexico, Guatemala, Nicaragua, Costa Rica, Panama

See also
 List of Linyphiidae species (A–H)

References

Linyphiidae
Spiders of South America